Janet Coles (born August 4, 1954) is an American professional golfer who played on the LPGA Tour.

Coles won twice on the LPGA Tour in 1978 and 1983.

On August 22, 2011, Coles was named head coach of the Dartmouth College women's golf team.

Professional wins (2)

LPGA Tour wins (2)

LPGA Tour playoff record (1–0)

References

External links

American female golfers
UCLA Bruins women's golfers
LPGA Tour golfers
College golf coaches in the United States
Golfers from California
1954 births
Living people